The Romaine River is a river in the Côte-Nord region of the Canadian province of Quebec. It flows south into the Gulf of Saint Lawrence.

Location

The river has a Strahler number of 7.
It has its source on the boundary between the Atlantic and Saint Lawrence watersheds, and flows first through a series of lakes, including Long, Marc, Brûlé (Burnt), Lavoie, Anderson, and Lozeau. This portion of the river to just past the confluence with Uauahkue Patauan Creek forms the boundary between Quebec and Labrador. Then it flows in a mostly southerly direction until a dozen miles from the coast where it takes a sharp turn to the west, flowing through a series of swampy waterlogged small lakes. The Romaine River drains into the Jacques Cartier Strait, opposite the Mingan Archipelago, that is part of the Gulf of Saint Lawrence.

Name

The name Romaine, in use since the end of the 19th century, is a French adaptation of a word from a First Nations language, Ouraman or Ulaman, as noted by Jean-Baptiste-Louis Franquelin in 1685, while Jacques-Nicolas Bellin wrote Ramane on his map of 1744. Deposits of this material are found on the banks of the Olomane River.

Basin

It lies between the basins of the Mingan River to the west and the Ours River to the east.
About 15.5% of the basin is in Labrador north of the provincial boundary.
In Quebec the basin includes parts of the unorganized territory of Lac-Jérôme and the municipality of Havre-Saint-Pierre.
The Mine du lac Tio, an iron and titanium mine, is in the river basin.
It also includes the proposed Buttes du Lac aux Sauterelles biodiversity reserve.

Tributaries
The significant tributaries of the Romaine River are (in upstream order):
 Puyjalon River
 Allard River
 South-East Romaine River
 Abbé Huard River
 Garneau River
 West Garneau River
 Little Romaine River
 Touladis River
 Sauterelles River
 Rivière aux Pêchueurs

Hydroelectric development

The Romaine River is being developed by Hydro-Québec for hydro-electric power generation. Called "the biggest construction project in Canada", the project will employ an estimated 2000 people between 2012 and 2016, and create some 3.5 billion in economic spinoffs.

The final project will include four new power plants with a total installed capacity of more than 1550 MW and an average annual production of 7.5 TWh:

This project is controversial however, as the cost of electricity production may be higher than the price at which the electricity will be sold, as shown in a 2010 documentary called "Chercher le courant" ("Seeking The Current") by Nicolas Boisclair and Alexis de Gheldère. The film argues that the Romaine project is unnecessary, unprofitable, and ecologically destructive. It is also opposed by the Fondation Rivières.

Fauna
Other fish species are brook trout (found along the river's entire length), lake trout (in most lakes), and landlocked salmon (upstream of Grande Chute).

See also
 La Romaine, Quebec
 French Wikipedia article on Hydro-Quebec's Projet de la Romaine

References

Sources

Rivers of Côte-Nord